Memsahab is a Hindi Cinema/Drama Film recorded in 2008. he film stars Yukta Mookhey and Vijay Raaz. Memsahab is a woman-oriented movie with a social message of non-violence. In Memsahab, Yukta has to be lauded for staged a comeback with a sincere effort. She has adorned a bold new look in this flick. Yukta admits that getting into the character of a prostitute was a bit tough and bold too but she portrayed it with honesty. Her idol is Shabana Azmi who played an award-winning role of a prostitute in ‘Mandi’.

Synopsis

Memsahab is based on the cruel incidents post the 1984 riots between a section of Congress party activists and the Sikhs in Delhi and other parts of North India.. Ensuing these riots, the Sikhs were targeted by the Congress party activists and several Sikh families were ruined.

Yukta Mookhey plays the character of Anjali, who is a victim of the riots and is pushed into prostitution. This young girl Anjali’s mother is raped by the villains and her father is shot dead. What a horrifying impact would this have on the girl! This Anjali grows up with such traumatic memories of her childhood.

The director seeks to portray reality by actually shooting in a few bye lanes of Kamathipura (a red light area in Mumbai), where Anjali is one of the many women indulging in flesh trade. Every night, this woman has a new ‘Sahab’.

Some unexpected incidents take place and she stumbles upon the killers of her parents. She starts searching for them and hunting them one by one. In the process where she takes revenge on the killers of her dad, she realizes that the violence wouldn't help her get back her victimized parents. She then realizes that even after taking revenge she still could not erase her traumatic memories of childhood. Wisdom dawns on her and then she takes startling decision in the end.

Cast
Yukta Mookhey as Anjali
Vijay Raaz
Govind Namdeo as Kashinath 
Rafique Khan as Rahul
Rajpal Yadav   
Ehsaan Khan as Lalji
Monish Anand  
Akshay Verma as Nandu
Nilanjana Bhattacharya   
Shoorveer Tyagi   
Rajeeta Kochhar
Sambhavana Seth as item number "Priya Pardesia"

Soundtrack
The soundtrack features seven songs including the item number "Piya Pardesia" picturized on Sambhavana Sheth. Music for the film is composed by Murlidhar Alia, with original lyrics by Ibrahim Ashq.

Track List 

1. The Soul of Memsahab
2. Qatil Haseena Hoon
3. Piya Pardesia
4. Pata Dhadkanon Se             Udit Narayan, Alka Yagnik
5. Padoon Tore Main Paiyan
6. Kya Khoya Kya Paya
7. Piya Pardesia (Remix)

References

Further reading

External links
 
Memsahab - Lost In A Mirage
Yukta exudes subdued charm at "Memsahab" launch party
Movie Premiere of "Memsahab - Lost in a Mirage"

2008 films
2000s Hindi-language films